Gateside railway station served the village of Gateside, Fife, Scotland from 1858 to 1950 on the Fife and Kinross Railway.

History 
The station opened on 15 March 1858 by the North British Railway. To the south of the only platform was the goods yard. The station closed on 5 June 1950.

References 

Disused railway stations in Fife
Former North British Railway stations
Railway stations in Great Britain opened in 1858
Railway stations in Great Britain closed in 1950
1858 establishments in Scotland
1950 disestablishments in Scotland